Drag Race Thailand is a Thai reality competition television series, based on the American RuPaul's Drag Race. The series was licensed by the Kantana Group and premiered on 15 February 2018. The show is hosted by fashion stylist Art Arya, while drag performer Pangina Heals co-hosts. The series was renewed for a second season in 2018, and the second season began airing on 11 January 2019. In 2021, the series was renewed for a third season.

Series overview

Episodes

Season 1 (2018)

Season 2 (2019)

References 

Drag Race Thailand
Thailand